Cuala is a Dublin GAA club in Dublin, Ireland.

Cuala may also refer to:

 Cuala Press, a former Irish private press
 Cualu or Cuala, a former territory in Ireland

See also
 Cuala-cuala, a species of flowering plant
 Kuala, a town in Indonesia
 Kuala Lumpur, capital city of Malaysia
 Koala, a marsupial
 Coala, a video game
 Quala, a Colombian company